The railway station at Swaffham Prior was on the Cambridge and Mildenhall branch of the Great Eastern Railway. The railway began operating to Swaffham Prior in 1884; the station closed in 1962, and then passed into private ownership. It is located on Station Road and is still inhabited.

References

External links
 Swaffham Prior station on navigable 1946 O. S. map
 Swaffham Prior at Disused Stations

Disused railway stations in Cambridgeshire
Former Great Eastern Railway stations
Railway stations in Great Britain opened in 1884
Railway stations in Great Britain closed in 1962